General elections were held in the Faroe Islands on 30 April 1998.

Results

See also
List of members of the Løgting, 1998–2002

Elections in the Faroe Islands
Faroes
1998 in the Faroe Islands
April 1998 events in Europe